The California State University - San Bernardino College of Arts & Letters provides liberal arts education at CSUSB. The college contains nineteen academic departments and a number of interdisciplinary programs, each of which is designed to help students understand their role in society and to develop aesthetic sensibilities. With 300 permanent faculty and many associated lecturers, this is the largest of the seven colleges, and is responsible for over one-third of the instruction at CSUSB. Because the college occupies an important role in general education, virtually all CSUSB students take courses here.

Academics

Departments
The College of Arts & Letters includes several academic departments:
 Art
 Communication Studies
 English
 Liberal Studies
 Music
 Philosophy
 Theatre Arts
 World Languages & Literatures

Special programs
 Asian Studies
 African American Studies
 Institute for International Security and Conflict Resolution (ISCOR)
 Latin American Studies

Institutes, research centers and facilities
 Visual Resource Center
 Robert and Frances Fullerton Museum of Art

Publications and media
 Coyote Chronicle
 Coyote Radio

See also
California State University, San Bernardino

References

External links

California State University, San Bernardino